The Ekiti State House of Assembly is the legislative arm of the government  of Ekiti State of Nigeria. It is a unicameral legislature with 26 members elected from the 16 local government areas (State Constituencies) of the state.  Local government areas with considerable larger population are delineated into two constituencies to give equal representation. This makes the number of legislators in the Ekiti State House of Assembly 26.

The fundamental functions of the Assembly are to enact new laws, amend or repeal existing laws and oversight of the executive. Members of the assembly are elected for a term of four years concurrent with federal legislators (Senate and House of Representatives). The state assembly convenes three different days a week (Tuesdays, Wednesdays and Thursdays) for plenary sessions in the assembly complex within the state capital, Ado-Ekiti.

The current speaker of the 6th Ekiti State House of Assembly is Olubunmi Adelugba, the first female speaker, who succeeded  Gboyega Aribisogan following his impeachment on 21 November 2022.

References 

Politics of Ekiti State
State legislatures of Nigeria